Raju Khanal is a member of 2nd Nepalese Constituent Assembly. He won Dang–3 seat in 2013 Nepalese Constituent Assembly election from Nepali Congress. His son Gaurav Khanal is studying in Sydney and is determined to follow in his footsteps of politics and strives to enter once he is done with his studies.

References

Year of birth missing (living people)
Nepali Congress politicians from Lumbini Province
Living people
Members of the 2nd Nepalese Constituent Assembly